Robert Vernon Walk (born November 26, 1956), nicknamed "The Whirly Bird", is an American former professional baseball pitcher, who played in Major League Baseball (MLB) for the Philadelphia Phillies, Atlanta Braves (–), and Pittsburgh Pirates (–).

Philadelphia Phillies
During his rookie season in Philadelphia, Walk won his first six decisions, finished with an 11–7 record and was the winning pitcher in Game One of the 1980 World Series, his Phillies defeating the Kansas City Royals in six games.

Atlanta Braves
Walk was traded from the Phillies to the Braves for Gary Matthews on March 25, 1981. He bounced between the main club and Triple-A, until being released in March 1984.

Pittsburgh Pirates
He was named to the All-Star team in  when he won 12 games and posted a 2.71 ERA.

In his waning years, Walk served as a spot starter and swingman for the Pirates' teams that won three straight NL East titles from –. His most memorable outing being when manager Jim Leyland removed him from the bullpen and named him a surprise starter in Game Five of the 1992 NLCS against Atlanta. Walk tossed a complete game three-hitter to stave off elimination in a series which the Pirates would eventually lose in seven games. He was also the pitcher who was warming up in the bullpen when Francisco Cabrera hit the two-run, game-winning single against Stan Belinda, which won the series for Atlanta. Despite both Walk and Cabrera being right-handers, Leyland opted to keep Belinda (despite having walked Damon Berryhill to load the bases and giving up a deep fly ball to Ron Gant) to pitch to Cabrera.

In 1993, Walk recorded an NL-worst 5.68 ERA and retired after the season.

Post-career
Walk is currently an announcer for the Pittsburgh Pirates on AT&T SportsNet Pittsburgh and radio. He is also a fill-in game analyst for MLB on FOX as well as a game analyst for Peacock’s MLB Sunday Leadoff during Pirates games.

Personal
Walk is the father of three children, Tommy, Johnny, and Ronnie.

When Walk was a teenager, he attended a game at Dodger Stadium and threw a tennis ball from the stands at Houston Astros centerfielder César Cedeño. He was charged with battery but ultimately released after promising to the judge that he would not go to Dodger Stadium again.

References

External links

Bob Walk at Baseball Almanac

1956 births
Living people
Atlanta Braves players
Baseball players from California
Carolina Mudcats players
College of the Canyons Cougars baseball players
Hawaii Islanders players
Major League Baseball broadcasters
Major League Baseball pitchers
National League All-Stars
Oklahoma City 89ers players
Peninsula Pilots players
People from Greater Los Angeles
People from Van Nuys, Los Angeles
Philadelphia Phillies players
Pittsburgh Pirates announcers
Pittsburgh Pirates players
Reading Phillies players
Richmond Braves players
Spartanburg Phillies players